Pendragon PLC is the second largest motor retailer in the United Kingdom. It operates the Evans Halshaw, Stratstone, brands of Quickco, Car Store used car supermarkets in United Kingdom, and dealerships in the United States. The company is based at Annesley, Nottingham. It is listed on the London Stock Exchange.

History

Pendragon became a public limited company, when the vehicle division of Williams Holdings which operated nineteen car dealerships, was demerged in 1989. From its establishment in 1989 until April 2010, the company was chaired by Sir Nigel Rudd.

In 1990, the company's portfolio to incorporate volume car franchises, such as Ford and Vauxhall. Following this, Pendragon began a series of high profile acquisitions. The Stratstone brand was acquired in 1992, establishing a relationship for Pendragon with Jaguar and Land Rover.

In August 1997, an acquisition of Lex Service PLC and their seventeen volume car dealerships took place.

In August 1998, Pinewood computers was acquired by Pendragon, expanding the company's portfolio into the specialist areas of dealer management systems, telecommunications and remote security monitoring systems for the retail motor industry. Pendragon went on to acquire the whole shared capital of Evans Halshaw in February 1999.

After this, a further thirty two franchised dealerships were bought from Lex Service PLC in March 2000.

In July 2000, Pendragon expanded into America, with their acquisition of Bauer Jaguar, the third largest Jaguar dealership in America. Throughout the remainder of 2000 to 2001, various other dealerships based in California were acquired, including Hornburg in April 2001, which held the Jaguar and Land Rover dealership in Los Angeles.

Pendragon PLC bought Reg Vardy PLC in December 2005, taking on a total of ninety six new dealerships. However, in April 2006, Pendragon were unable to complete a proposed takeover of Lookers. Soon thereafter, the automotive industry was hit by a recession, leading to the closure of dealerships, and job cuts in both the United Kingdom and United States.

In April 2019, shares in the company fell 13%, after it posted their £2.8 million first quarter loss, substantially below the £6 million profit predicted by analysts.

After an initial business review in June 2019, it is found that losses incurred by its division of Car Store would jump from £11.9m in 2018 to over £25m in 2019, as a result of excess used car stock and execution inefficiency. Its CEO, Mark Herbert, would leave after joining the company for three months.

Operations
The Pendragon Group is organised into several divisions:
Stratstone represents a variety of luxury car and motorcycle manufacturers, including Aston Martin, BMW, Ferrari, Harley-Davidson, Jaguar, Land Rover, Mercedes-Benz, Mini, Morgan, Porsche, Smart and Triumph.
Evans Halshaw is a volume car retailer with manufacturer brands including Vauxhall, Ford, Citroën, Peugeot, Renault, Nissan, Hyundai, Kia, Honda, Dacia and SEAT.
 Car Store is an online vehicle store
 Pinewood Technologies is a software division responsible for a dealer management system
California focuses on car sales in the United States.

References

External links
 Pendragon PLC – Official Website
 PENDRAGON PLC 02304195 via Companies House

Companies listed on the London Stock Exchange
Retail companies established in 1989
Auto dealerships of the United Kingdom
Companies based in Nottinghamshire